The 2021 Women's World Floorball Championships were held from 27 November to 5 December 2021 in Uppsala, Sweden.

Qualification

Venues

Draw
The draw took place on 22 May 2021 in Uppsala, Sweden.

(*) Russia is not allowed to use its flag, coat of arms or national anthem during the tournament.

Preliminary round

Group A

Group B

Group C

Group D

Knockout stage

Bracket

Play-off round

Quarterfinals

Semifinals

Bronze-medal game

Final

Placement round

13th place Bracket

13–16th-place semifinals

15th-place game

13th-place game

9th place Bracket

9–12th-place semifinals

11th-place game

9th-place game

5th place Bracket

5–8th-place game

7th-place game

5th-place game

Final ranking

References

Floorball World Championships
World Championships
2021 in Swedish sport
International sports competitions hosted by Sweden
Sports competitions in Uppsala
World Floorball Championships
World Floorball Championships